Kutabpur  is a village in Kapurthala district of Punjab State, India. The village is administrated by a Sarpanch who is an elected representative.

Demography 
According to the report published by Census India in 2011, Kutabpur has 45 houses with the total population of 204 persons of which 109 are male and 95 females. Literacy rate of  Kutabpur is 75.57%, lower than the state average of 75.84%.  The population of children in the age group 0–6 years is 28 which is 13.73% of the total population.  Child sex ratio is approximately 1000, higher than the state average of 846.

Population data

References

External links 
 Kapurthala Villages List

Villages in Kapurthala district